The 2003 Bulgarian Figure Skating Championships were the National Championships of the 2002–03 figure skating season. Skaters competed in the disciplines of men's singles, ladies' singles, pair skating, and ice dancing on the senior level.

he results were used to choose the teams to the 2003 World Championships and the 2003 European Championships.

Results

Men

Ladies

Pairs

Ice dancing

* Ina Demireva / Tsvetan Georgiev were the junior national champions and only competitors, and the ISU recognizes them as the senior silver medalists.

External links
 results

Bulgarian Figure Skating Championships, 2003
Bulgarian Figure Skating Championships, 2003